Xestia sareptana is a moth of the family Noctuidae. It is known from few localities in the European part of south-eastern Russia, Turkey, the Caucasus region, western Iran, Lebanon and Israel.

Adults are on wing in September to October. There is one generation per year.

External links
 Noctuinae of Israel

sareptana
Moths of Europe
Moths of Asia